The RS600 is a sailing dinghy designed by Clive Everest and Nick Peters and supplied by RS Sailing. It is now built by the Boatyard at Beer. It is a single hander with trapeze and racks. It has a Portsmouth Yardstick of 916 and a D-PN of 76.2.

Performance and design
The RS600 has an epoxy hull, with aluminium racks available in 2 sizes, depending on the helm's weight. The mast is stayed, rotating, carbon fibre with a removable bottom section, allowing the mast to be shortened when the sail is reefed. Sail plan is a single Mylar fully battened main sail, with a zip in reef. 

In 2007, the RS600 with hydrofoils became available. The hydrofoil version known as the RS600FF is a standard RS600 hull with rudder gantry, different foils and a wand attached to the bow. Most RS600FF's are retro fitted RS600s, though new built boats are available in both varieties.

References

External links
 RS Sailing (Global HQ
 ISAF Connect to Sailing
 International RS Classes Association
 UK RS Association
 German RS Class Association
 Facebook/RS600

Dinghies
Boats designed by Clive Everest
Boats designed by Nick Peters
Sailboat types built by RS Sailing